MacMillan, Macmillan, McMillen or McMillan may refer to:

People 
 McMillan (surname)
 Clan MacMillan, a Highland Scottish clan
 Harold Macmillan, British statesman and politician
 James MacMillan, Scottish composer
 William Duncan MacMillan, American physicist and educator

Places

Australia 
 Division of McMillan, electoral district in Australian House of Representatives in Victoria

Canada 
 Macmillan River, a river in the Yukon Territory of northwestern Canada
 MacMillan Provincial Park, a provincial park in British Columbia, Canada

United States 
 McMillan Mesa, a mesa in Flagstaff, Coconino County, Arizona.
 McMillan, Michigan
 McMillan Township, Luce County, Michigan
 McMillan Township, Ontonagon County, Michigan
 McMillan, Oklahoma, an unincorporated community
 McMillan, Wisconsin, a town
 McMillan (community), Wisconsin, an unincorporated community
 McMillan Reservoir in Washington, D.C.

Companies and organizations 
 McMillan (agency), a Canadian creative agency
 Macmillan Cancer Support, a British charity
 McMillan Hotels, a hotel group
 McMillan LLP, a Canadian law firm
 McMillan Firearms Manufacturing
 McMillan TAC-50, a sniper rifle
 Macmillan Publishers, a multinational publishing group
 Macmillan Publishers (United States), a former subsidiary
 Macmillan Inc., a now mostly defunct American publishing company
 Macmillan of Canada, a Canadian publishing house.
 MacMillan Bloedel, a Canadian forestry company
 Macmillan Academy, an academy in Middlesbrough, North Yorkshire, England
 Palgrave Macmillan, a British academic and trade publishing company

Other uses 
 MacMillan (crater)
 McMillan & Wife, a 1970s television series
 McMillan Plan, a 1901 development plan for Washington, D.C.
 Captain MacMillan, a character from the 2007 video game Call of Duty 4: Modern Warfare